Hassiba Ben Bouali (18 January 1938 – 9 October 1957) was a leader and fighter in the Algerian independence war (1954–62).

Biography
Hassiba Ben Bouali  was born in El-Asnam (Today, Chlef), Algeria, into an aristocratic family.

Her parents moved to Algiers in 1947, where she studied at the Lycée Delacroix (high-school). She joined the Scout Movement, and her travels made her aware of the conditions of the Algerian people under the colonial government. This motivated her to join the Union générale des étudiants musulmans algériens (General Union of Algerian Muslim Students) in 1954, at the age of 16. She participated in the nationalist struggle until her death. In the 1957 Battle of Algiers, she and three companions including Ali Ammar (aka Ali La Pointe) were killed when French forces bombed their hideout in the Casbah.

Benbouali was depicted in the movie The Battle of Algiers by Italian director Gillo Pontecorvo. One of the largest avenues in Algiers and the University of Chlef were named after her.

References

External links
  Universite Hassiba Ben Bouali biography (French)

1938 births
1957 deaths
People from Chlef
Algerian guerrillas killed in action
African women in war
Deaths by explosive device
Members of the National Liberation Front (Algeria)
Women in warfare post-1945

ar:حسيبة بن بوعلي